European Party may refer to:

 European Party (Cyprus), a centrist political party in Cyprus founded in 2005
 European Party of Ukraine

See also
 European Democratic Party, a centrist European political party in favour of European integration
 European Green Party, the Green political party at European level
 European People's Party, a centre-right European political party
 European Workers Party, Sweden
 European political party, the transnational political parties of the European Union